Mark Hadfield is an English actor.

Before starting his professional career, Hadfield trained at the Royal Academy of Dramatic Art (RADA).

Career

Theatre
Hadfield's work in theatre includes: 
Thérèse Raquin (for which he received an Olivier Award nomination for Best Supporting Actor)
Le Bourgeois Gentilhomme
A Midsummer Night's Dream and The Hour We Knew Nothing of Each Other at the National Theatre, London;
The Canterbury Tales
Jubilee
Twelfth Night
A Midsummer Night's Dream
The Seagull
The Two Gentlemen of Verona
Bartholomew Fair
Talk of the City
The Comedy of Errors
Hamlet
The Plain Dealer
The Plantagenets and Kissing The Pope for the RSC
A Night at the Dogs at the Soho Theatre, London
By Many Wounds and Cracked at Hampstead Theatre, London
Romeo and Juliet at the Lyric Hammersmith, London
The Twilight of the Golds at the Arts Theatre, London
Blockheads at the Mermaid Theatre, London
The Danube and Amphitryon at the Gate Theatre, London
Child of the Snow
Two's Company and Tom Foolery at Bristol Old Vic
The 39 Steps
The Plough and the Stars and Peter Pan at West Yorkshire Playhouse, Leeds
Man and Superman and Don Juan for the Peter Hall Company at the Theatre Royal, Bath
A Midsummer Night's Dream in Stoke
Savage Amusement at Derby Playhouse
One Flew Over the Cuckoo's Nest and Macbeth at the Belgrade Theatre, Coventry
Anything Goes at the Crucible Theatre, Sheffield
Donkey's Years national UK tour and The Lion King
Snoopy!!! The Musical
An Italian Straw Hat and Much Ado About Nothing in the West End, London.
Into the Woods at Open Air Theatre, Regent's Park
Jeeves and Wooster in Perfect Nonsense, at Duke of York's Theatre, London 
Made in Dagenham, at Adelphi Theatre, London
Mrs Henderson Presents, at Theatre Royal, Bath
Pinocchio, at National Theatre, London

Television
Hadfield's television credits include: 
Foyle's War
Casualty
Holby City
The Bill
Headless
Rhona
The Vice
The Wyvern Mystery
Cold War
People Like Us
Crown Court
Butterflies
Last Song
Pig Sty
Van der Valk
Cracker
Wallander
Outlander (Series 3)

Film
In film, he has appeared in: Dummy, A Cock and Bull Story, Felicia's Journey, In the Bleak Midwinter, Mary Shelley's Frankenstein, Century and Just Like a Woman.
He also appeared in the Heinekin Adverts with Sylvestra Le Touzel. (Water in Majorca).

Radio
Hadfield's radio appearances include: A High Wind in Jamaica, The Trial of Ruth Ellis, Talk of the City and Fungus the Bogeyman.

References

Alumni of RADA
English male television actors
Living people
English male stage actors
English male film actors
English male radio actors
1959 births